El viaje de Copperpot (Copperpot's Voyage) is Spanish pop rock band La Oreja de Van Gogh's second studio album, issued by Epic Records on 11 September 2000. It was the band's first album to feature a bonus track.
El viaje de Copperpot is the band's most successful album in Spain; after going platinum on its release day, it sold more than 1,300,000 copies and received a diamond certification. The album also catapulted the band's fame in Latin America going 3× Platinum in Mexico (under Mexican certification before 2001, 750,000 was 3× Platinum, but today it would be Diamond or 7× Platinum). Over 2,000,000 copies were sold worldwide. The album's title is inspired by Chester Copperpot, a scavenger in the film The Goonies.

It received generally favourable reviews from critics and produced eight Top 20 singles, including "Cuidate", "La Playa" and "Paris" which reached the No.1 spot on the Spain chart; as well as the hits "Mariposa" and "Soledad".
It is considered their best album to date and one of the best pop albums in Spanish.

Track listing

Personnel

Performing
 La Oreja de Van Gogh
 Amaia Montero – vocals, backing vocals
 Xabi San Martín – keyboards, backing vocals, programming
 Pablo Benegas – guitar
 Álvaro Fuentes – bass
 Haritz Garde – percussion

Technical
 Nigel Walker – record production, audio mixing
 Stefan Prin – technical production
 Rycky Graham – sound recording
 Rubén Suárez – sound recording
 Tony Cousins – audio mastering

Design
 Ricky Dávila – photography
 Lanzagorta Studios – graphic design

Singles

 2000 – Cuídate #1 (SPA), #1 (MEX)
 2000 – París #1 (SPA), #1 (MEX)
 2001 – La Playa #1 (SPA), #1 (MEX), #21 (US Latin)
 2001 – Pop #1 (SPA)
 2001 – Soledad #1 (SPA)
 2001 – Mariposa #1 (SPA)
 2001 – La Chica del Gorro Azul
 2002 – Tu Pelo

Other song
 Los Amantes Del Circulo Polar #5 (SPA)  #37 (US Latin)

Sales and certifications

See also
List of albums containing a hidden track
List of best-selling albums in Spain
 List of best-selling Latin albums

References

2000 albums
La Oreja de Van Gogh albums